The Wohlstandskinder ("Children of prosperity", shortform WSK or W$K) was a punk rock band from Overath near Cologne, Germany that was founded in 1995. They define their music as Provinzrock ("Province rock"). After their 10th anniversary in December 2005 they produced a double-live-album, which was also released as DVD.

Name
"The" was added to the band name in 2000, according to the official statement on their website as an Adelsprädikat ("an ennobling descriptor") and as sign for Posertum and Möchtegernglamour ("Wannabe-glamour").

Members
The Wohlstandskinder are:
Honolulu Silver - Vocals, Guitar
Türk Travolta - Lead-Guitar
Raki Neidhardt - Bass
Don Ludger de la Cardeneo - Drums

Discography
The Wohlstandskinder published several singles and five studio albums. They have also been sampled several times.

They have recorded two music-videos (Wie ein Stern and Kein Radiosong), the last one was even shown on the German music-television station VIVA (but only very late in the evening).

On their tours they promoted bands like Sum 41, The Offspring, Die Happy and Donots.

Demos 
1996: Mit Sex verkauft sich alles -Demo (Sex sells everything)

LPs 
1997: Für Recht und Ordnung (For Right and order)
1997: Poppxapank
1999: Delikatessen 500sl (delicatesses 500sl)
2000: En Garde
2002: Baby, Blau! (Baby, blue)
2003: Poppxapank + Die 90er waren zum Recyclen da (Re- release)
2004: Dezibelkarate
2005: Zwischen Image und Gewohnheit" (Between image and habits)/live

EPs
1998: Die 90er waren zum Recyclen da  (The 90s had to be used for recycling)
2001: Untot macht hirnpolitisch - EP (undead makes brainpolitical) (under the nickname "Kinderkacke", which means in English "unimportant", lit. children poo)

Singles
2002: Wir sehen uns in Las Vegas  (We'll meet again in Las Vegas)
2003: Wie ein Stern  (Like a star)
2004: Kein Radiosong  (No radio song) (not released)

VHS & DVDWie ein Stern 2002 (Like a star, VHS)Zwischen Image und Gewohnheit"'' (Between image and habits)/live (DVD)

External links
wohlstandskinder.de Official site, in German

German musical groups
German punk rock groups